Vehicle size classes are series of ratings assigned to different segments of automotive vehicles for the purposes of vehicle emissions control and fuel economy calculation. Various methods are used to classify vehicles; in North America, passenger vehicles are classified by total interior capacity while trucks are classified by gross vehicle weight rating (GVWR). Vehicle segments in the European Union use linear measurements to describe size. Asian vehicle classifications are a combination of dimensions and engine displacement.

North America

United States

Vehicle classifications of four government agencies are in use in the United States: the United States Environmental Protection Agency (EPA), the National Highway Traffic Safety Administration (NHTSA as part of their NCAP program), Federal Highway Administration (FHWA), and the U.S. Census Bureau. The Insurance Institute for Highway Safety also has its own vehicle classification system that is used by most vehicle insurance companies in the U.S.

EPA
EPA size classes are defined in Federal Regulation, Title 40—Protection of Environment, Section 600.315-08 "Classes of comparable automobiles". This information is repeated in the Fuel Economy Guide.  Passenger car classes are defined based on interior volume index (the combined passenger and cargo volume) and are as follows.

Trucks classes are defined by gross vehicle weight rating (GVWR). The administrator classifies light trucks (nonpassenger automobiles) into the following classes: Small pickup trucks, standard pickup trucks, vans, minivans, and SUVs. Starting in the 2013 model year, SUVs are divided between small sport utility vehicles and standard sport utility vehicles. Pickup trucks and SUVs are separated by car line on the basis of gross vehicle weight rating (GVWR). For a product line with more than one GVWR,  the characteristic GVWR value for the product line is established by calculating the arithmetic average of all distinct GVWR values less than or equal to 8,500 pounds available for that product line.

Special purpose vehicles. All automobiles with GVWR less than or equal to 8,500 pounds and all medium-duty passenger vehicles which possess special features and which the administrator determines are more appropriately classified separately from typical automobiles.

NHTSA
Unlike the EPA, which groups automobiles by interior volume, the NHTSA groups cars for NCAP testing by weight class.

FHWA
Developed in the 1980s, the Federal Highway Administration 13-category classification rule set is currently used for most federal reporting requirements and that serves as the basis for most state vehicle classification systems.

U.S. Census Bureau
The Census Bureau surveys the United States truck population.  Large truck owners (NHTSA classes 4-13) are given a standard survey, and small truck (pickups, vans, minivans, and sport utility vehicles) owners (NHTSA class 3) are given a short survey. In the United States the government agencies consider all pickups, vans, minivans, and sport utility vehicles to be trucks for regulatory purposes, no matter what construction method is used, either unibody or body on frame.  Coupe utilities are considered pickup trucks in the U.S., not cars.  SUVs are always considered trucks, although there are some CUVs with low ground clearance which are considered station wagon or hatchback cars for regulatory purposes.

IIHS
The Insurance Institute has its own crash test program and groups cars by curb weight and shadow into six classes, micro, mini, small, midsize, large and very large.

Canada
Cars are divided into six classes based on interior volume, as shown in the table below. These classes are not defined in Canadian regulations, but by the Fuel Consumption Guide published by Natural Resources Canada. An interior volume index is calculated from the combined passenger and trunk or cargo space. Pickup trucks, special purpose vehicles and vans are segmented in their own respective classes.  As most Canadian cars share designs with American cars, Canada's classifications closely mirror those of the United States.

Vehicle classes for trucks are listed in On-Road Vehicle and Engine Emission Regulations (SOR/2003-2), published in Canada Gazette Part 2, Vol. 137 No. 1.

Medium-duty passenger vehicle is classified as a heavy-duty vehicle that is designed primarily for the transportation of up to 12 people.

A motorcycle is classified as an on-road vehicle with a headlight, taillight and stoplight that has two or three wheels and a curb weight of 793 kg or less, but does not include a vehicle that has an engine displacement of less than 50 cc, or that, with an 80 kg (176 pound) driver:
 Cannot start from a dead stop using only the engine
 Cannot exceed a speed of 40 km/h on a level paved surface

Europe

EEC 

Vehicle segments in Europe do not have formal characterization or regulations. Models segments tend to be based on comparison to well-known brand models. For example, a car such as the Volkswagen Golf might be described as being in the Ford Focus size class, or vice versa. The VW Polo is smaller, so it belongs one segment below the Golf, while the bigger Passat is one segment above.

The names of the segments were mentioned, but not defined, in 1999 in an EU document titled Case No COMP/M.1406 Hyundai / Kia Regulation (EEC) No 4064/89 Merger Procedure.
 A: mini cars
 B: small cars
 C: medium cars
 D: large cars
 E: executive cars
 F: luxury cars 
 J: sport utility cars (including off-road vehicles)
 M: Multi purpose cars
 S: Sports cars

EuroNCAP 
EuroNCAP applies a standard safety test to all new cars, the results are listed in separate categories to allow prospective vehicle purchasers to compare models of a similar size and shape:
 Small family cars (also for stand-alone saloon superminis, like the Dacia Logan)
 Large family cars (includes compact executive cars)
 Executive cars (for expensive cars over 4.80 m long)
 Roadsters
 Small off-roaders (similar to the North American crossover SUV category)
 Large off-roaders (similar to the North American SUV category)
 Small MPVs (both mini MPVs and compact MPVs)
 Large MPVs

Asia

China
Vehicle size categories for passenger vehicles for the China NCAP program as defined by the China Automotive Technology and Research Center (CATARC) may appear similar to the European system, but are closer to the Japanese in application.
 Category A (A-segment) vehicles are two-box vehicles of between 4 and 4.5 meters in length, or three-box vehicles (i.e., sedans with trunks) with engines of less than 1600 cc.
 Category B (B-segment) vehicles are longer than 4.5 m in length with engines of over 1600 cc.
 Multi-purpose vehicles, or MPVs
 Sport utility vehicles or SUVs

India
The Society of Indian Automobile Manufacturers (SIAM) divides Indian passenger vehicles into the segments A1, A2, A3, A4, A5, A6, B1, B2 and SUV. The classification is done solely based on the length of the vehicle. The details of the segments are below:

Japan 
 Sections of this article are translated from Japanese Wikipedia.
Vehicle size classes in Japan are rather simple compared to other regions. The classifications were established under the Japanese Government's Road Vehicle Act of 1951. There are just three different classes defined by regulations.  The dimension regulations are enforced to exact measurements. These standards of classification are enforced on all vehicles within the jurisdiction of Japan, and no special consideration is made for the vehicles' origination of manufacture. The Japanese law regulates all vehicles that do not travel on railroads (traditional or maglev), or are not powered by physically contacting overhead power lines. The law regulates vehicles that are powered by an autonomous power source. Smaller cars are more popular in Japan due to the confined driving conditions and speed limits.
 Keijidosha (light cars): Buyers of Kei cars enjoy a number of tax, registration and other benefits to encourage the purchase of these tiny vehicles (among road vehicles requiring a license only). Regulations have been updated a number of times over the years to allow larger, more powerful cars to be developed and maintain demand as buyers become more affluent, and to improve collision protection performance.
 Small size Passenger vehicles, commonly called "5 number" vehicles in reference to their license-plate prefix. Vans, trucks and station wagons (considered commercial vehicles in Japan) in the compact size class receive a "4 number" license prefix. Before 1989, the annual tax rate of normal-size class was more than doubled of this class so that most Japanese cars were built within small-size class requirement. Now the annual tax rate only varies with engine displacement however useful small-size class cars are still popular in Japanese market, and Japanese manufacturers make regular improvements to compact sized products to maximize interior accommodation while remaining within the exterior boundaries.
This regulation also mandates that all passenger vehicles can not exceed  length or  width. Based on market conditions, vehicles such as the first generation Honda Legend (shorter and narrower V6Gi and V6Zi variants with a 2.0 V6 engine), and the Mitsubishi Starion were produced in both "compact size" (just under 4.7 m long and 1.7 m wide) for the Japanese market, and longer or wider "passenger size" versions, primarily for export.

Motorcycles also have classification definitions based on engine size:
 Class I moped  Engine size must be at or less than 50 cc, identified by blue text and white extra small license plate.
 Class II moped (B)  Engine size is between 50–90 cc, identified by blue text and yellow extra small license plate.
 Class II moped (MIG)  Engine size is between 90–125 cc, identified by blue text and pink extra small license plate (colour of plate can vary according to regional requirements)
 Motorcycle light  Engine size is between 125–250 cc, identified by green text and white small license plate.
 Motorcycle medium  Engine size is between 250–400 cc, identified by green outline and green text with white small license plate.
 Motorcycle large  Engine size is over 400 cc, identified by green outline and green text with white small license plate.

All vehicles with an engine displacement over 250 cc are required to undergo an inspection (called "Shaken" in Japan). Vehicle weight tax and mandatory vehicle insurance are usually paid at this time. This is separate from the road tax paid yearly.

See also
 Car body style
 Car classification
 Directive 2001/116/EC
 Truck classification
 Vehicle category

References

Car classifications